LZS may refer to:

 Latvijas Zemnieku savienība, a political party in Latvia
 Lempel–Ziv–Stac, a lossless data compression algorithm
 Leutnant zur See, a rank in the German Navy
 Ludowe Zespoły Sportowe, a union of Polish  sport clubs